Arcesilaus (316/5–241/0 BC) was a Greek philosopher.

Arcesilaus or Arkesilaos is a Greek name (Arcesilaus is the Latin spelling), which may also refer to:

People

Four Kings of Cyrene
Arcesilaus I of Cyrene (fl. 7th–6th centuries BC)
Arcesilaus II of Cyrene (fl. 6th century BC)
Arcesilaus III of Cyrene (fl. 6th century BC)
Arcesilaus IV of Cyrene (fl. 5th century BC)

Others
 Arcesilaus (mythology), one of the Greek leaders in the Trojan War
 Arcesilaus (satrap) (fl. 4th century BC), one of Alexander the Great's generals
 Arcesilaus (consul) (fl. 3rd century BC), Roman senator appointed consul in AD 267
 Arcesilaus (sculptor) (fl. 1st century), Roman sculptor

Astronomy
 20961 Arkesilaos, an asteroid

See also
 Archelaus (disambiguation), a name commonly transliterated as "Arcesilaus"